Adnan Ahmedic (born 15 July 1975) is a classical guitarist born in Sarajevo, Bosnia and Herzegovina. Ahmedic gave recitals throughout Europe and Asia and also appeared as soloist with several chamber and symphonic orchestras.

Classical guitarist Adnan Ahmedic
At an early age he was a pupil of classical guitarist Ivan Kalcina who inspired him to pursue guitar as his life calling. During the Bosnian War he moved first to Frankfurt, Germany, in 1994 and then to Vienna in 1996, where he attended and graduated with a degree from the Prayner Conservatory in 2002.

He oftentimes engages other musicians (most often pianists) and visual artists in exhibition shows, where they showcase their own work alongside him and this cross disciplinary approach gains him more attention in the public eye.

He is lately involved in cultural sector initiatives in Bosnia & Herzegovina, promoting cross-border cooperation and EU integration in area of culture, creation of European cooperation platforms, cultural networking.
He performed in varies cities in China  in 2018 and 2019 and made appearance in CHINA-CEEC  SPRING FESTIVAL GALA

He does lot of transcription work, mainly of traditional, modern, world music, and national folk songs, notes for classical guitar that he published in three paper edition with IMKA Publishing Company called "Absolute Hits, Volume I,II,III"

Label: Sarajevo Disk

Discography

Albums 
Fiesta 
Solo & Chamber 
 Mediterranean Fusion

Personal life
Ahmedic is also a tennis player, professionally playing on the ITF tour. He played tennis since he was 7.

References

External links 
 

1975 births
Living people
Bosnia and Herzegovina classical guitarists
Musicians from Sarajevo
21st-century guitarists